Fémina Visé is a Belgian women's handball club from Visé. It was originally established in 1975 as Amicale Visé's women's team before becoming an independent club in 1986 under its current name.  

Fémina has been one of the Belgian Championship's leading teams for the past 22 years, with twelve titles since 1997. It is also a regular team in EHF competition's qualifying stages.

Titles
 Belgian First Division: 12
 1997, 1998, 1999, 2000, 2001, 2004, 2007, 2008, 2009, 2010, 2012, 2014
 Belgian Cup: 13
 1994, 1998, 1999, 2000, 2003, 2004, 2007, 2008, 2009, 2013, 2014, 2016, 2017

European record

References

Belgian handball clubs
Visé